William Higgins, also known as "Wim Hof" (December 19, 1942 – December 21, 2019) was an American director of gay pornographic films who based his businesses in the Czech Republic since 1996. He started his career as a porn director and producer in Fort Lauderdale, Florida, when sellers of pornographic movies, including Falcon refused to mail them to customers in many southeastern states for legal reasons. In addition, he said in an interview, that gay porn movies were "so bad" that he decided to begin making them himself. In 1978, he was busted and his premises raided. Although the  charges were later dropped, Higgins decided to go on a "world tour" looking for a better legal environment for his films. After rejecting Australia and Thailand as new venues, he settled in Amsterdam, where his distributor was, and later relocated to Prague, a less expensive city. Although the legal climate in the U.S. has changed, he had no interest in returning.

His first film, A Married Man, was produced in 1974. He went on to produce over 140 internationally distributed titles. His films won several Grabby Awards and he is in the GayVN Awards Hall of Fame. He was also the founder of the film production company Catalina Video.

Higgins died on December 21, 2019, of a heart attack.

Awards and nominations
 1984 Gay Producers Association winner of Special Achievement Award for "Sailor in the Wild 1".
 1985 X-Rated Critics Organization winner of Best Depiction of Safe Sex for "The Young & the Hung".
 2000 Grabby Awards nomination for Best International Video and Best Videograph.
 2000 Grabby Awards winner of Best Classic DVD.
 2003 Grabby Awards winner of Best Classic DVD.

Selected filmography

 1974 A Married Man
 1978 Boys of Venice
 1979 Kip Noll and the Westside Boys
 1980 Boys of San Francisco
 1980 Class of '84: Boys of Venice Go to College
 1981 Pacific Coast Highway
 1981 Brothers Should Do It
 1981 Class of '84 2: The Adventure Continues
 1982 Buster Goes to Laguna
 1983 Cousins
 1983 Sailor in the Wild
 1984 Frat House Memories
 1985 Pizza Boy: He Delivers
 1985 Young and the Hung
 1987 Big Guns
 1988 William Higgins – Screen Test
 1989 Down Under
 1990 Catalina Orgies
 1991 Sex in the Great Outdoors
 1992 Frat Pack
 1997 Wim Hof's Rough Cut (as Wim Hof)
 1997 Puda: The Attic (as Wim Hof)
 1998 Sex in the Can
 1999 Double Czech (as Wim Hof)
 2001 Prague Buddies 3: Liebestod
 2001 The Jan Dvorak Story
 2001 The Seven Deadly Sins: Wrath (as Wim Hof)
 2002 Hard Day's
 2003 Kick Club
 2005 Inside Jirka Gregor
 2006 Weapon of Mass Attraction
 2007 Load Warriors
 2008 Bjorn Free
 2009 Exploring Rudolf Schneider
 2009 Double Czech 2009

References

External links

 
 
 

Directors of gay pornographic films
American film directors
American pornographic film directors
American pornographic film producers
American expatriates in the Czech Republic
LGBT pornographic film actors
2019 deaths
1942 births